The 2012 UK Open Qualifier 4 was the fourth of eight 2012 UK Open Darts Qualifiers which was held at the Metrodome in Barnsley on Sunday 25 March.

Prize money

Draw

References

4